Kilmoganny (officially Kilmaganny) is a small village in the County Kilkenny in the south-east of Ireland. Saint Mogeanna was an Irish virgin whose feast day in the Irish Calendar of Saints is 29 January. 

It is home to a primary school, post office, a pub, 2 churches, a GAA field and a local shop called Morans or locally known as Pete’s. The village is at the junction of the R697 and R701 roads.

Kilmoganny is in the Diocese of Ossory, in the civil parish of Kilmaganny. St. Eoghan's Catholic church is in the parish of Dunnamaggin. St. Matthew's Church of Ireland church is in Kells parish.

As of the 2016 census, Kilmoganny had a population of 245.

References

Towns and villages in County Kilkenny
Census towns in County Kilkenny